Colonel Ahmed Mohammed Ali (also known as Ahmed Ali; born 19 November 1972) is the media adviser to the Egyptian president Abdel Fattah el-Sisi and the ex spokesperson of the Egyptian Army. He was appointed first Army Sopkesman on the backdrop of the deposition of president Mohamed Morsi, and his official Army Spokesman Facebook page exceeded 2,000,000 followers at the time, and the Egyptian media kept a close and attentive watch of the statuses published by the army, often resulting in army related articles and reports.

Ali finished his studies at Egypt's military college in 1991. Afterwards he served in the Egyptian army's infantry corps, where he held various positions, including regiment commander. He then assumed a position with the military college's teaching facility, as well as that of the army's general command and officer's school.

Qualifications

 Bachelor of Military Sciences from the military College
 Bachelor of Military Sciences from Royal Military Academy Sandhurst
 The inevitable Educational brigades of infantry Unit
 US Army Command & General Staff College, Fort Leavenworth, Kansas 's Course
 M.A. of Military Sciences from Commanders and General Staff College 
 School of Advanced Military Studies, Fort Leavenworth, Kansas 's Course
 M.A. of Military Sciences from School of Advanced Military Studies
 NATO Defense College, Rome, IT 's Senior leaders' Course
 Defense Language Institute, Lackland Air force Base, Texas 's Diploma in English.

Orders, decorations and medals

 Military Duty Decoration, Second Third.
 Military Duty Decoration, Second Class.
 Military Duty Decoration, First Class.
 Longevity & Exemplary Medal.
 Silver Jubilee of October War Medal.
 Golden Jubilee of the 23rd of July Revolution.
 Silver Jubilee of The Liberation Of Sinai Medal.
  Brunei Medal from Royal Military Academy Sandhurst
 25 January Revolution Medal.

References

Spokespersons
1972 births
Military personnel from Cairo
Living people
Graduates of the Royal Military Academy Sandhurst
Egyptian Military Academy alumni